Ratdech Kruatiwa (born May 18, 1985 in Angthong, Thailand) is a Thai professional basketball player.  He currently plays for the Mono Vampire Basketball Club in the ASEAN Basketball League (ABL). Kruatiwa is arguably one of Thailand's most prominent basketball players.

Kruatiwa is the first Thai basketball player to play in a basketball league in the United States after he was signed by the Maryland Nighthawks of the Premier Basketball League.

References

1985 births
Living people
Ratdech Kruatiwa
Ratdech Kruatiwa
Expatriate basketball people in the United States
Ratdech Kruatiwa
Shooting guards
ASEAN Basketball League players
Small forwards
Ratdech Kruatiwa
Ratdech Kruatiwa
Southeast Asian Games medalists in basketball
Competitors at the 2013 Southeast Asian Games
Competitors at the 2017 Southeast Asian Games